The Institute for Practical Research and Training (IPRT) is a non-governmental organization based in Hargeisa, Somaliland/Somalia that specializes in (applied) research and training.

References

External links
IPRT website

Organisations based in Somaliland
Educational organisations based in Somalia
1998 establishments in Somalia